Griffith Evans (1887–1973) is an American mathematician

Griffith Evans may also refer to:

 Griffith Evans (bacteriologist) (1835–1935), Welsh veterinary pathologist
 Griffith Evans (politician) (1869–1943), Australian politician